Choice theory may refer to:

 Rational choice theory, the mainstream choice theory in economics, and the "heart" of microeconomics
 non-standard theories are in their infancy and mostly the subject of behavioral economics
 Social choice theory, a conglomerate of models and results concerning the aggregation of individual choices into collective choices
 Glasser's choice theory, a psychological theory used in some brands of counseling